Don Eric Mlangeni is a South African actor who acted in dramas such as Hlala Kwabafileyo and Ubambo Lwam, as well as in Zulu language comedy series 'Sgudi 'Snaysi and the soap opera Uzalo.

References

South African male television actors
Living people
Year of birth missing (living people)